QZS-1R is a Japanese navigation satellite consisting part of the Quasi-Zenith Satellite System (QZSS). QZS-1R will replace the QZS-1 (Michibiki-1) satellite launched in September 2010. QZS-1 has a design life of ten years. As QZS-1 is an experimental satellite, it did not broadcast the MADOCA (Multi-GNSS Advanced Demonstration tool for Orbit and Clock Analysis) signal, which can be used for centimeter-order navigation. With the launch of QZS-1R, all satellites of QZSS will be capable of transmitting in the MADOCA signal, reaching operational capacity.

Satellite 
QZS-1R is the fourth operational Quasi-Zenith Satellite to be launched. The design of the satellite is based on QZS-2 and 4, with minor differences such as an increase in the number of temperature sensors on board.

Launch 
QZS-1R was launched on 26 October 2021 by Mitsubishi Heavy Industries.

References

External links 
 Special website of launch 

Satellites of Japan
Spacecraft launched in 2021
2021 in Japan
Spacecraft launched by H-II rockets